The Planning Exchange was established in Glasgow in 1972 as an offshoot of the Centre for Environmental Studies (CES). Its aim was to provide a source of information on good practice and a forum for the debate of problems in the regions by bringing together the professions,  leaders of civic organisations, and community action groups, starting with planning problems but expanding to cover other interests and wider geographical areas.

In 2002 Idox plc
 acquired the assets of The Planning Exchange charity, which changed its name to The Planning Exchange Foundation

Beginnings

The foundations of the Planning Exchange were laid in 1965 where a three day conference took place in Churchill College in Cambridge for the Centre for Environmental Studies. Attendees for this event included architects, economists, geographers, politicians, administrative civil servants and building contractors. Also in attendance were directors of research organisations in Britain, the US, Netherlands and Japan and officials of the Ford Foundation who financed the conference.

The Planning Exchange was first officially established in Glasgow in 1972 as part of the  Centre for Environmental Studies and would later become a separate company in 1975, gaining charitable status in 1980.  The first Director - Professor J.B.Cullingworth, Director of the Centre for Urban and Regional Studies at the University of Birmingham - took up his post on 1 October 1972, succeeded in 1975 by Tony Burton.

It developed a comprehensive library and information service, carried out many research projects while building a database on the development of new towns and developed a number of publications including Scottish Planning and Environmental Law.

The Information Service
A library of official publications, journals, books, and semi-published or grey literature was established using a system devised by Brenda White of the Planning Research Unit at Edinburgh University following her research into information needs in Town and Country Planning.

Scottish Planning and Environmental Law

Scottish Planning Law and Practice was launched in 1980 and continues to be published in digital format as Scottish Planning & Environmental Law.

The New Towns Record
To mark the 50th anniversary of the passing of the New Towns Act 1946, the Planning Exchange was commissioned to create an electronic library of the documents, reports and plans connected with the New Towns Programme.

Work commenced in 1999 to scan documents using optical character recognition to create searchable text. Interviews, including some with local residents, were added along with thousands of images. The first edition was produced on CD 

.

Acquisition by Idox
In May 2002 the assets of the Planning Exchange were sold to Idox plc. The Planning Exchange charity changed its name to Planning Exchange Foundation Having no staff or assets other than the proceeds of the sale, the Foundation decided to use these funds to award research grants. The Information Service continues as Idox Knowledge Exchange

Official Records
Records of the Planning Exchange are held in Glasgow City Archives

References 

Organizations established in 1972
Foundations based in Scotland